Eye Spy may refer to:

Eye Spy Magazine, a British magazine focusing on the intelligence community
Eye Spy (EP), an EP by Bullet for My Valentine
"Eye Spy" (Agents of S.H.I.E.L.D.), an episode of the television series Agents of S.H.I.E.L.D.
"Eye Spy" (NCIS), an episode of the television series NCIS
"Eye Spy", an episode of the television series Zoboomafoo

See also
 I Spy (disambiguation)